Abdülaziz Solmaz (born 7 August 1988) is a Turkish footballer who plays as a midfielder for Kastamonuspor 1966. He made his Süper Lig debut on 24 January 2009.

References

External links
 
 
 

1988 births
People from Araklı
Living people
Turkish footballers
Turkey youth international footballers
Turkey B international footballers
Association football midfielders
Trabzonspor footballers
Pazarspor footballers
MKE Ankaragücü footballers
Samsunspor footballers
Eskişehirspor footballers
Boluspor footballers
İstanbul Başakşehir F.K. players
Giresunspor footballers
Şanlıurfaspor footballers
Adanaspor footballers
Sakaryaspor footballers
Süper Lig players
TFF First League players
TFF Second League players
TFF Third League players